Alexandrina Găinușe (1932–2012) was a Romanian politician (Communist).

She served as Minister of Labour in 1986.

References

1932 births
2012 deaths
20th-century Romanian women politicians
20th-century Romanian politicians
Romanian communists
Women government ministers of Romania